Marcel Maxa (born 20 October 1974) is a Czech alpine skier. He competed in three events at the 1998 Winter Olympics.

References

1974 births
Living people
Czech male alpine skiers
Olympic alpine skiers of the Czech Republic
Alpine skiers at the 1998 Winter Olympics
Sportspeople from Plzeň